Wilson Township is a township in Osceola County, Iowa, USA.  The township is home to Hawkeye Point, the highest natural point in Iowa, at 1,670 ft.

History
Wilson Township was founded in 1872.

References

Townships in Osceola County, Iowa
Townships in Iowa
Populated places established in 1872